Juan Carlos Escamilla (born June 10, 1978) is a former state representative from Arizona, he represented the 4th district. Escamilla was elected to the Arizona House of Representatives in 2013 after serving for six years as the Mayor of San Luis, Arizona. He is a member of the Democratic Party.

References

External links
 Vote Smart page

1978 births
Living people
Politicians from Yakima, Washington
Hispanic and Latino American state legislators in Arizona
People from Yuma County, Arizona
Arizona Western College alumni
Mayors of places in Arizona
Democratic Party members of the Arizona House of Representatives